Thecha is a spicy condiment prepared in the state of Maharashtra. It has many variants but the primary ingredients are chili peppers (green or red), peanuts and garlic, often tempered in oil (generally peanut) and a multitude of spices such as cumin, sesame seeds, coriander seeds, hing, cloves, coriander leaves and grated coconut seasoning. Traditional recipes call for the ingredients to be crushed or pounded in metal or Mortar Pestle, but modern kitchens often rely on grinding in food processors. It is served with dishes like pithla bhakri. or is eaten with bhakri. A regional variation is the varhadi thecha. It has been described by Sanjeev Kapoor as a popular relish. It gets spoilt after 10 to 15 days

References

Maharashtrian cuisine
Vegetarian dishes of India